is a 1982 Japanese  animated science fiction adventure film based on the third volume of the same name of the Doraemon Long Stories series. It was released on 13 March 1982 in Japan. It's the 3rd Doraemon film and was animated by Shin-Ei Animation. A remake of this film was released on March 8, 2014, entitled Doraemon: New Nobita's Great Demon—Peko and the Exploration Party of Five. It is one of the films that is focused on another character than Nobita.

Plot

One day, Nobita has stuck in the school again, his teacher not letting him to go because he hadn't completed his homework. While his teacher had allowed him to go, Nobita rushed to his house, fearing that his mother would scold him. On his way, he found a dog, dirty and hungry, after fighting with a dog the previous night. Nobita wanted to help it, but he couldn't. When his mom sent him to bring some things from the market, he had gone there, and while he returned, he spotted the dog again, and Nobita gave him a sausage that he had brought from the market. The dog tried to follow him, but Nobita chased the dog away, fearing his mother will scold him because of her dislike of pets. But when Nobita's mom lost her purse, the dog helped her in finding her purse. To repay the dog's help, she agrees to keep the dog as a pet. After Nobita and Doraemon cleaned the dog, they named him Peko.

Earlier, Nobita and his friends talked about wanting to go on some adventure, and asked Doraemon for that. Doraemon launched a rocket to find unexplored areas on the planet by taking satellite pictures, mainly from Africa. They have left searching for it, knowing that it would be very difficult to handle too many pictures. However, Peko tinkered with the device while Nobita and Doraemon are away, and found a mysterious giant statue somewhere in Africa. After consulting with Dekisugi, he deduced that the area where the statue is was never explored because there's always a thick fog around it, something that doesn't effect Doraemon's satellite pictures. Excited that they might have found something no one has discovered, Nobita, Doraemon, and all of their friends, including Shizuka, Gian, and Suneo, planned to go on an expedition to find the statue.

After the first day of the expedition, Gian got annoyed by the group's overreliance on Doraemon's gadgets, including Shizuka using the Anywhere Door to go home to use the restroom, or the group hindering several wild animals with them, and angrily went off. At night, however, he was visited by the mysterious statue in his bedroom, who tells him about hidden treasures before disappearing. Interested, Gian rejoins the group the next day, but tells Doraemon to leave any gadgets that they use the day before. When they are cruising on a crocodile infested river with a ship, Gian forgot to steer it when he was throwing coconuts at crocodiles, causing the ship to crash. With the Anywhere Door burned by people who mistakenly thought it was garbage, the group was almost swarmed by crocodiles, but they got rescued by a group of natives, who takes them to the village. The natives know about the mysterious statue, and told Doraemon that they have to go through a lion-infested savanna and a very deep gorge. This scares the group, but Gian claims that he will get the treasure on the statue, which angers the natives who believes doing so will curse their village. That night, when the group camps and laments on their situation without some of Doraemon's gadgets, Gian accused them of blaming him and angrily goes to bed, but when Peko visits him, he broke down crying.

When the group reached the savanna, the mysterious statue appears again and drives the lions off. When they safely reached the bottom of the deep gorge and figured out the superstitions surrounding it, Peko, now fully trusting the group, reveals himself to be a prince of a kingdom of bipedal dogs with human intelligence. He told them that the evil minister Daburanda and his lackey Dr. Kos were planning to conquer the world, assassinates the king, and accidentally throw Peko, who's trapped in a coffin, into the underground river in the gorge, causing him to meet Nobita. Doraemon and his friends decided to help him. First, they searched for Burusasu, one of Peko's loyal bodyguards, but found out he's arrested by Daburanda's soldiers. After helping a young puppy named Chippo, they free Burusasu from a prison, but Daburanda and his army commander, Saberu, realize that Peko is back, and began a search for him and Doraemon's group. Daburanda also reveals that he has princess Spiana captive in his palace.

While everyone is hiding from Daburanda's soldiers, Burusasu said there was a saying that, "When the world will be covered by darkness, 10 travelers will come and move the statue's heart to save the palace.". Doraemon thinks the travelers are him, Nobita, Shizuka, Gian, and Suneo, but realizes there are only five of them. When Chippo is hungry, Doraemon uses the Anticipating Promise Machine to make everyone feel full, but they have to fulfill the promise the next day.

The next night, the group went to the statue, but was ambushed by Daburanda's soldiers. Burusasu faces the soldiers and lets Peko pass, but soon they got cornered by Dr. Kos and his aerial fleet. Peko was willing to hold the army back while the group escape, but Gian followed him, and soon the entire group does. Finally, they decided to get to the statue together, which is guarded by Daburanda, Saberu, and an army. When Nobita wonders about the old saying of ten travelers, Shizuka uses the Anticipating Promise Machine for help. Suddenly, the second group of Doraemon, Nobita, Shizuka, Gian, and Suneo appears, fully equipped with weapon gadgets, and fights Daburanda and his army while the main group enters the statue, followed by Saberu. When Nobita lags behind, Saberu catches up to him. Despite given the Denkomaru sword, Nobita takes a long time dueling the skilled Saberu before finally defeating him. The group fighting the army is also forced to retreat when Dr. Kos arrives with his aerial fleet.

Eventually, Peko and the rest of the group manage to reach the statue's heart, which is a mechanism to bring the statue 'alive' like a robot. Using it, Dr. Kos and the army were defeated, and Daburanda flees to the palace. He tried to bring princess Spiana with him, but Peko, using the statue, arrives in time and rescues her. Peko soon became the rightful ruler of the kingdom, and the other Doraemon gives the original Doraemon a new Anywhere Door to go home.

When the group came back home, they realized that they still have to fulfill one last the promise made from the Anticipating Promise Machine. The episode ends when Nobita leads everyone to the Time Machine to go back in time and help their past selves fight Daburanda's army and enter the statue.

Cast

References

External links

1982 films
1982 anime films
1980s children's animated films
Nobita and the Haunts of Evil
Animated films about dogs
Films directed by Hideo Nishimaki
Films set in Africa
Toho animated films
Films scored by Shunsuke Kikuchi
Animated films about cats
Animated films about animals
Japanese children's films